Tulku Urgyen Rinpoche (1920 – February 13, 1996) was a Buddhist master of the Kagyü and Nyingma lineages who lived at Nagi Gompa hermitage in Nepal. Urgyen Rinpoche was considered one of the greatest Dzogchen masters of his time.

Life
Born in Kham in Eastern Tibet in 1920, he was recognized by Khakyab Dorje, 15th Karmapa Lama as the reincarnation of both the Chowang Tulku and Nubchen Sangye Yeshe, one of the 25 principal students of Padmasambhava.

Urgyen's father was Tsangsar Chimey Dorje, a vajrayana instructor who began giving Urgyen transmission for the Kangyur, the Buddha, and "The New Treasures of Chokgyur Lingpa." As he grew older, he studied Dzogchen with Samten Gyatso.

He had four sons, each of whom is now an important Buddhist teacher in his own right (Chökyi Nyima Rinpoche, Tsikey Chokling Rinpoche, Tsoknyi Rinpoche and Mingyur Rinpoche); one of his grandsons is Kyabgön Phakchok Rinpoche.

Urgyen spent 33 years at Nagi Gompa Hermitage, where he spent two decades in retreat, and eventually established six monasteries and retreat centers in Nepal. This included a monastery close to the Great Jarung Khashor Stupa in Boudhanath (Ka-Nying Shedrub Ling monastery). Another is the Tergar Osel Ling Monastery in Kathmandu, Nepal.

Urgyen Rinpoche died on the morning of February 13, 1996.

Teaching

Tulku Urgyen was the author of the two-volume As It Is, which deals with the subject of emptiness. His main transmissions were the Chokling Tersar and the pointing-out instruction.

Buddhist teacher and writer Marcia Binder Schmidt wrote of him:

Author and neuroscientist Sam Harris was a student of Tulku Urgyen Rinpoche. Describing the Dzogchen instruction he received, Harris wrote:

References

External links
Peer Reviewed Biography of Tulku Urgyen by Dr. Alexander Gardner on The Treasury of Lives

1920 births
1996 deaths
20th-century lamas
Dzogchen lamas
Kagyu lamas
Kagyu tulkus
Nyingma lamas
Nyingma tulkus
Rinpoches
Tibetan Buddhism writers
Tibetan Buddhists from Nepal
Tibetan Buddhists from Tibet
Tulkus